Aspen Comics (Aspen MLT Inc.) is a California entertainment company founded in 2003 by artist Michael Turner. It has locations in Santa Monica and Marina Del Rey. The company is best known for producing comic books and figurines.

History
The company was founded by comic book artist Michael Turner in January 2003. The name "Aspen" comes from the main character in Turner's comic series, Fathom. Aspen Comics released the fantasy adventure Soulfire in 2004, its first ongoing series. 2005 marked the return of Fathom (originally published by Image Comics), with comic artist Koi Turnbull taking over the illustration of the title. Ekos, a collaboration between Turner and Geoff Johns was scheduled to follow shortly after Soulfire, but was still unreleased prior to Turner's death in 2008.

In 2001, Top Cow Productions announced a live-action Fathom feature film and supposedly entered into an agreement with James Cameron's Lightstorm Entertainment to co-produce the film.

Staff
 Founder - Michael Turner
 Co-Owner - Peter Steigerwald
 Co-Owner/President - Frank Mastromauro
 Vice President/Design and Production - Mark Roslan
 Vice President/Editor in Chief - Vince Hernandez
 Marketing and Production Manager - Sara Hasson
 Office Manager - Megan Shirk

Titles
 Artifact One
 Aspen
 Aspen Swimsuit: Splash
 Broken Pieces
 Bubblegun
 Charismagic
 Damsels in Excess
 Dellec
 Ekos
 Eternal Soulfire
 Executive Assistant Assassins
 Executive Assistant Iris
 Fathom
 Fathom Blue
 Fathom: Kiani
 Four Points, The
 Idolized
 Iron and the Maiden
 Homecoming
 Lady Mechanika
 Legend of the Shadow Clan
 Lola XOXO
 Mindfield
 Oniba: Swords of the Demon
 Overtaken
 Psycho Bonkers
 Portal Bound
 Santeria: The Goddess Kiss
 Shrugged
 Soulfire
 Trish Out of Water - a side story in the Fathom continuity, with different characters.  A five-issue limited series written by Vince Hernandez, drawn by Giuseppe Cafaro, colored by Ruben Curto and Studio Parlapa and lettered by Josh Reed.  Published in 2013-2014.
 The Zoo Hunters

Collaborations
Aspen MLT has worked together with both DC Comics and Marvel Comics on major cross-company collaborations. The most well-known are DC's Superman: Godfall and Superman/Batman: Supergirl, where creators of Aspen MLT worked together with DC to create art and story for these comics. Following this, both DC and Marvel contracted Michael Turner to produce covers for their series.

Aspen/DC works
 Flash (covers)
 Identity Crisis (covers)
 Supergirl (variant covers - #1-5, interior colors #1-4)
 Superman: Godfall (covers and interior art)
 Superman/Batman: Supergirl (covers and interior art - #8-13)
 Superman/Batman #26 (covers)
 Teen Titans (variant cover - #1)
 Justice League of America (covers)

Aspen/Marvel works
 Black Panther (#23-25 - covers (Turner) and interiors (Turnbull))
 Civil War (variant covers - #1-7)
 Incredible Hulk (variant cover - #100)
 Hulk (variant covers 1, 6 & 7)
 Ms. Marvel (variant cover - #1)
 Onslaught: Reborn (variant cover - #1)
 Ultimate Wolverine (promo art, series never completed)
 Ultimate X-Men (variant cover - #75)
 Wolverine: Origins (variant cover - #1)
 Wolverine'' Wolverine #66 Old Man Logan

Notable creators
 Talent Caldwell
 Jason Gorder
Siya Oum
 Micah Gunnell
 Vince Hernandez
 Don Ho
 Geoff Johns
 J. T. Krul
 Jeph Loeb
 A. Mahadeo
 Frank Mastromauro
 David Morán
 Mark Roslan
 Beth Sotelo
 Peter Steigerwald
 Christina Strain
 Marcus To
 Koi Turnbull
 Michael Turner

References

External links
 Official website of Aspen MLT Inc.

Aspen Comics
Comic book publishing companies of the United States